Copley railway station was a railway station that served the village of Copley in West Yorkshire, England.

References

Disused railway stations in Calderdale
Former Lancashire and Yorkshire Railway stations
Railway stations in Great Britain opened in 1856
Railway stations in Great Britain closed in 1931